Julia Vida Dutton Scudder (1861–1954) was an American  educator, writer, and welfare activist in the social gospel movement.

Early life
She was born in Madurai, India, on December 15, 1861, the only child of David Coit Scudder (of the Scudder family of missionaries in India) and Harriet Louise (Dutton) Scudder. After her father, a Congregationalist missionary, was accidentally drowned in 1862, she and her mother returned to the family home in Boston. Apart from travel in Europe, she attended private secondary schools in Boston, and was graduated from the Boston Girl's Latin School in 1880. Scudder then entered Smith College, where she received her BA degree in 1884.

In 1885 she and Clara French were the first American women admitted to the graduate program at Oxford, where she was influenced by York Powell and John Ruskin. While in England she was also influenced by Leo Tolstoi and by George Bernard Shaw and Fabian socialism. Scudder and French returned to Boston in 1886.

Academic career and social activism
Scudder taught English literature from 1887 at Wellesley College, where she became an associate professor in 1892 and full professor in 1910.

She was one of the founders, in 1887, of the College Settlements Association, along with Helena Dudley, Katharine Coman, Katharine Lee Bates, and other women. She and Emily Greene Balch were also involved with the establishment of the CSA's third settlement house venture, Denison House in Boston. Scudder was its primary administrator from 1893 to 1913.

When French died in 1888, Scudder joined the Society of the Companions of the Holy Cross, a group of Episcopal women dedicated to intercessionary prayer and social reconciliation. Also in 1888, she joined the Society of Christian Socialists, which, under William Dwight Porter Bliss, established the Church of the Carpenter in Boston and published The Dawn.

In 1893, Scudder was a delegate to the convention of the Boston Central Labor Union. Later, she helped organize the Federal Labor Union, a group of professional people who associated themselves with the American Federation of Labor.

Having received a leave of absence from Wellesley for 1894–1896, Scudder spent a year in Italy and France studying modern Italian and French literature.

In 1903, Scudder helped organize the Women's Trade Union League. The same year she became director of the Circolo Italo-Americano at Denison House.

Moving farther to the left, in 1911, she co-founded the Episcopal Church Socialist League and joined the Socialist Party. Scudder attempted to reconcile the conflicting doctrines of Marxism and Christianity. She became controversial in 1912 when she supported striking textile workers in Lawrence, Massachusetts, and spoke at a strike meeting, but Wellesley resisted calls for her dismissal as a professor. In Scudder's famous speech, she declared,

I would rather never again wear a thread of woolen than know my garments had been woven at the cost of such misery as I have seen and known past the shadow of a doubt to have existed in this town. ... If the wages are of necessity below the standard to maintain man and woman in decency and in health, then the woolen industry has not a present right to exist in Massachusetts.

In 1913, Scudder ended her association with Denison House and moved to Wellesley, Massachusetts, with her elderly mother, who died in 1920.

Unlike Eugene Victor Debs and other Socialist leaders, Scudder supported President Woodrow Wilson's decision to intervene in the First World War in 1917. In 1919 she founded the Church League for Industrial Democracy.

From 1919 until her death, Scudder lived with Florence Converse. In Wellesley they resided at 45 Leighton Road. She lived with Helena Dudley, her closest friend, from 1922 until Dudley's death in 1932.

In the 1920s, Scudder embraced pacifism. She joined the Fellowship of Reconciliation in 1923, the same year she gave a series of lectures before the Women's International League for Peace and Freedom in Prague.

Later life
Scudder retired from Wellesley in 1927 and received the title of professor emeritus. She became the first dean of the Summer School of Christian Ethics in 1930 at Wellesley. In 1931 she lectured weekly at the New School for Social Research in New York. Having studied the Franciscans extensively after her retirement for Wellesley, she published The Franciscan Adventure, in 1931 which established her as one of the leading Franciscan scholars of her time.

She published an autobiography, On Journey, in London in 1937, and a collection of essays, The Privilege of Age, in New York in 1939.

Scudder had received the degree of LHD from Smith College in 1922. From Nashotah House, an Episcopal seminary in Nashotah, Wisconsin, she received an LLD degree in 1942.

Vida Dutton Scudder died at her home in Wellesley, Massachusetts, on October 9, 1954, and is buried alongside Florence Converse at Newton Cemetery, Newton, Massachusetts.

Veneration
Scudder is honored with a feast day on the liturgical calendar of the Episcopal Church (USA) on October 10.

Works
 How the Rain Sprites Were Freed. Boston: D. Lothrop, 1883.
 Poems by George Macdonald, 1887 (edited with Clara French).
 Mitsu-Yu-Nissi; or, The Japanese Wedding. Chicago: T.S. Denison 1887.
 Macaulay's Essay on Lord Clive. Boston: Sibley and Ducker, 1889 (edited).
 An Introduction to the Writings of John Ruskin. Boston: Leach, Shewell and Sanborn, 1890 edited.
 Topical Outlines for the Study of Modern English Literature. Boston: Frank Wood, 1892.
 Shelley's Prometheus Unbound, 1892 (edited).
 The Witness of Denial. New York: E.P. Dutton, 1895.
 The Life of the Spirit in the Modern English Poets. Boston and New York, Houghton, Mifflin and Company, 1895.
 Socialism and Spiritual Progress: A Speculation. Boston: Church Social Union, 1896.
 Social Ideals in English Letters. Boston and New York: Houghton, Mifflin and Company, 1898 (enlarged edition, 1923).
 Christian Simplicity. Boston: Christian Social Union, 1898.
 Introduction to the Study of English Literature, 1901 
 A Listener in Babel: Being a Series of Imaginary Conversations held at the Close of the Last Century and Reported by Vida D. Scudder. Boston: Houghton, Mifflin and Company, 1903.
 Saint Catherine of Siena as Seen in Her Letters. London: J.M. Dent, 1905; New York: E.P. Dutton, 1905 (edited and translated).
 The Disciple of a Saint, Being the Imaginary Biography of Raniero di Landoccio dei Pagliaresi. New York: E.P. Dutton, 1907 (reissued in 1921 and 1927).
 Works of John Woolman, 1910 (edited for Everyman's Library).
 Bede's History of England, 1911 (edited for Everyman's Library).
 Socialism and Character. Boston: Houghton Mifflin, 1912.
 English Poems, 1915 (edited for Lake English Classics).
 The Church and the Hour: Reflections of A Socialist Churchwoman. New York, E.P. Dutton, 1917.
 Le Morte D'Arthur of Sir Thomas Malory and Its Sources, 1917 (edited and translated).
 Social Teachings of the Christian Year: Lectures Delivered at the Cambridge Conference, 1918. New York: E.P. Dutton, 1921.
 Brother John: A Tale of the First Franciscans. Boston: Little, Brown, and Company, 1927.
 The Franciscan Adventure: A Study in the First Hundred Years of the Order of St. Francis of Assisi. London and Toronto: J.M. Dent, 1931; New York: E.P. Dutton, 1931.
 The Christian Attitude Toward Private Property. Milwaukee: Morehouse, 1934.
 On Journey. London: J.M. Dent and Sons, 1937.
 The Privilege of Age: Essays Secular and Spiritual. New York: E.P. Dutton, 1939.
 Father Huntington, Founder of the Order of the Holy Cross. New York: E.P. Dutton, 1940.
 Letters to Her Companions, by Emily Malbone Morgan. Edited by Vida Dutton Scudder, with a biographical sketch by Emily Sophie Brown. Privately printed, 1944.
 My Quest for Reality. Wellesley: Published by the Author, 1952.

References

Further reading
 Peter J. Frederick, Knights of the Golden Rule: The Intellectual As Christian Social Reformer in the 1890s. Lexington, KY: University Press of Kentucky, 1976.

External links
 Vida Dutton Scudder papers at the Sophia Smith Collection of Women's History, Smith College
 
 

1861 births
1954 deaths
American activists
American Christian socialists
American Episcopalians
American non-fiction writers
American women non-fiction writers
Anglican pacifists
Anglican saints
Anglo-Catholic socialists
Christian female saints of the Late Modern era
LGBT Anglicans
American LGBT writers
Wellesley College faculty
Women's Trade Union League people
Writers from Madurai
Female Christian socialists
LGBT people from Massachusetts
Indian LGBT writers
American women academics
College Settlements Association